Yaziji, alternatively Yazigi or Yazji is an Arabic surname of Turkish origin meaning 'clerk' or 'writer'. The Arabic definite article "Al-" is often added to render it Al-Yaziji or Al-Yazigi.

The Turkish equivalent is Yazici

Yaziji/Yazigi/Yazji may refer to:

Ibrahim al-Yaziji, Lebanese philologist	
John X (Yazigi) of Antioch (born 1955), Patriarch of Antioch and All The East, primate of the Greek Orthodox Patriarchate of Antioch and All The East
Nasif al-Yaziji, Lebanese author
Rosie Yazigi, Lebanese actress and voice actress
Zina Yazji, Syrian journalist, news agency reporter and news anchor

See also
Yazici

Arabic-language surnames